MediaCorp Channel 8's television series World at Your Feet is a sports drama series produced by MediaCorp in 2014 as a lead-up to the 2014 FIFA World Cup held at Brazil. The series, which stars Ha Yu, Tay Ping Hui, Elvin Ng, Zhang Zhen Xuan, Jeanette Aw and Yvonne Lim as the main characters, depicts a group of men who overcome adversities to attain their goal through hard work and determination.

As of 24 June 2014, 30 episodes of World at Your Feet have aired, concluding the series.

Episodes

References

See also
List of MediaCorp Channel 8 Chinese Drama Series (2010s)
World at Your Feet

Lists of Singaporean television series episodes
2014 Singaporean television series debuts
2014 Singaporean television series endings